The men's 200 metres event at the 1981 Summer Universiade was held at the Stadionul Naţional in Bucharest on 23, 24 and 25 July 1981.

Medalists

Results

Heats

Wind:Heat 4: +1.5 m/s, Heat 5: +2.0 m/s

Semifinals

Wind:Heat 1: +0.9 m/s, Heat 2: +1.4 m/s, Heat 3: ? m/s

Final

Wind: +0.4 m/s

References

Athletics at the 1981 Summer Universiade
1981